"Mirror, Mirror" is a song by American singer Diana Ross. Written by Dennis Matkosky and Michael Sembello, and produced by Ross herself, the song was released as the second single on December 11, 1981 by RCA Records from her Platinum-certified album Why Do Fools Fall in Love.

Background
The song talks of a love lost that the singer was going through and her deliberately asking herself while looking in the mirror why she allowed the love "to fall" apart, referencing the Wicked Queen's chant to the Magic Mirror in Snow White and the Seven Dwarfs: "Mirror, mirror on the wall". "Mirror Mirror" is also notable as one of the few songs that Ross sung both lead and background vocals.

Music video
The accompanying music video for "Mirror Mirror" was played on BET, but was rejected by MTV. It showcases the glamorous diva lip-synching the song and during the break, she dances with the video dividing her in double vision as she spins around. Despite the rudimentary production values, it was an early BET favorite. However, it was conspicuously left off of her best-selling VHS, and later DVD, compilation Visions of Diana Ross.

Personnel
Diana Ross − lead vocals, backing vocals, producer
Michael Brecker − tenor saxophone
Randy Brecker − horn arrangements
Ray Chew − musical arrangements, acoustic piano
Eric Gale − rhythm guitar
Yogi Horton − drums
Neil Jason − bass
Ralph MacDonald − percussion
Jeff Mironov − rhythm guitar
Ted Jensen at Sterling Sound, New York City − mastering
Bob Kulick − lead guitar

Charts
"Mirror Mirror" became another hit for Ross, reaching #2 on the Soul chart and peaking at number eight on the Billboard Hot 100  It became her second top 10 hit after leaving her longtime label, Motown, in the summer of 1981.

Weekly charts

Year-end charts

Live performances
"Mirror Mirror" was performed during Diana Ross' live concert in front of 800,000 people, Diana Ross Live in Central Park.
"Mirror Mirror" was performed on her 2010 concert tour. It was the first time it was performed in over 15 years.                 
"Mirror Mirror" debuted live on The Tonight Show Starring Johnny Carson (1981)

References

1981 songs
1981 singles
Diana Ross songs
Songs written by Dennis Matkosky
RCA Records singles
Songs written by Michael Sembello